The 12"/50 caliber gun Mark 8 was a US naval gun mounted on the . The gun, like the "large cruiser" that mounted it, was intended to fill the gap between US "heavy cruisers" (6-8") and US battleships (14-16"). The name describes the size of the shells, 12 inches in diameter, and the length of the bore in calibers (50 bore diameters).

Design and production
The gun was designed in 1939, and a prototype was tested in 1942. They were then sent to the Naval Gun Factory for processing, which was followed by a trip to Watervliet Arsenal until they were 65% complete. Finally, the built-up guns were sent back to the Naval Gun Factory to be finished.

The gun was first deployed in 1944, on the lead ship of the Alaska class, . The two Alaska-class ships each had nine Mark 8 guns mounted in three triple (3-gun) turrets, with two turrets forward and one aft, a configuration known as "2-A-1". Only two vessels of the class were completed, making them the only applications of the Mark 8 12"/50 caliber gun.

Measurements 
The Mark 8 weighed  including the breech and was capable of an average rate of fire of 2.4–3 rounds a minute. It could throw a 1,140 lb. (517.093 kg) Mark 18 armor-piercing shell 38,573 yards (35,271 meters) at an elevation of 45°. The previous 12" gun manufactured for the U.S. Navy was the Mark 7 version, used in the World War I era s, could only throw an  shell , at an elevation of 15°  The Mark 8's significant improvement in firing weight and range over the Mark 7 gave it the honor of "by far the most powerful weapon of its caliber ever placed in service." In fact, as a result of the decision to fire "super heavy" armor-piercing projectiles, the Mark 8's deck plate penetration was better and the side belt armor penetration equal to the older (but larger) 14"/50 caliber gun.

The barrel life of the Mark 8 guns was 344 rounds, 54 more than the 16"/50 caliber Mark 7 gun found in the s.

See also
16"/50 caliber Mark 7 gun
14"/50 caliber gun

References

External links

Naval guns of the United States
World War II naval weapons
305 mm artillery
Weapons and ammunition introduced in 1944